Murad Umakhanov (born 3 January 1977 in Khasavyurt, Dagestan, Russia) is a Russian wrestler and Olympic champion in Freestyle wrestling.

Umakhanov competed at the 2000 Summer Olympics in Sydney where he won the gold medal in Freestyle wrestling, the featherweight class.

References

External links
 

1977 births
Living people
Olympic wrestlers of Russia
Medalists at the 2000 Summer Olympics
Wrestlers at the 2000 Summer Olympics
Russian male sport wrestlers
Wrestlers at the 2004 Summer Olympics
Olympic gold medalists for Russia
People from Khasavyurt
Olympic medalists in wrestling
Sportspeople from Dagestan
20th-century Russian people
21st-century Russian people